The Charterhouse of Parma is a 1948 French-Italian historical drama film directed by Christian-Jaque and starring Renée Faure, Gérard Philipe and Maria Casarès. It is based on the 1839 novel of the same name by Stendhal. The film's sets were created by the art directors Jean d'Eaubonne and Ottavio Scotti and the costumes were designed by Georges Annenkov. The film was made at the Cinecittà Studios in Rome while location shooting took place in Italy around Milan and Lake Como.

It entered the competition at the 1948 Locarno International Film Festival, being awarded for best cinematography. It was the most popular French film at the French box office in 1948. In Italy it earned around 166 million lira on its release.

Cast
 Renée Faure as Clélia Conti
 Gérard Philipe as Fabrice del Dongo
 Maria Casarès as Duchess Gina de San Severina
 Louis Salou as Prince Ernest IV
 Louis Seigner as Grillo
 Tullio Carminati as Count Mosca
 Lucien Coëdel as Rassi
 Enrico Glori as Gilletti
 Aldo Silvani as General Conti
 Tina Lattanzi as Maria Luisa di Borbone-Parma
 Attilio Dottesio as Ferrante Palla
 Claudio Gora as Crescenzi
 Nerio Bernardi as Fausta's Husband

References

Bibliography
 Chiti, Roberto & Poppi, Roberto. Dizionario del cinema italiano: Dal 1945 al 1959. Gremese Editore, 1991.
 Moliterno, Gino. The A to Z of Italian Cinema. Scarecrow Press, 2009.

External links
 

1948 romantic drama films
Films based on works by Stendhal
Films directed by Christian-Jaque
French black-and-white films
French romantic drama films
Italian romantic drama films
Italian black-and-white films
1948 films
Films scored by Renzo Rossellini
Films shot in Italy
1940s historical drama films
French historical drama films
Italian historical drama films
Films set in the 19th century
Films shot at Cinecittà Studios
1940s French-language films
1940s Italian-language films
1940s French films
1940s Italian films